Henry R. Linden (February 21, 1922 – September 13, 2009) was an American chemist with a focus on energy research, president of the Institute of Gas Technology, founding president of the Gas Research Institute, and president of the Illinois Institute of Technology.
Linden was elected to the National Academy of Engineering "for contributions to methods of fuel conversion and energy utilization".
He was also a fellow of the American Association for the Advancement of Science, and a fellow of the American Institute of Chemical Engineers.
The Chicago Sun-Times called Linden "world-renowned authority in energy research".
The Illinois Institute of Technology called him "an icon at Illinois Institute of Technology (IIT) and global authority in energy research".

References 

1922 births
2009 deaths
20th-century American chemists
Fellows of the American Association for the Advancement of Science
Members of the United States National Academy of Engineering
Presidents of Illinois Institute of Technology
Fellows of the American Institute of Chemical Engineers
20th-century American academics